Norway participated in the Eurovision Song Contest 2018. The Norwegian broadcaster Norsk rikskringkasting (NRK) organised the national final Melodi Grand Prix 2018 in order to select the Norwegian entry for the 2018 contest in Lisbon, Portugal.

On the final, on 12 May 2018, the song finished in 15th place.

Background

Norway had won the contest on three occasions: in 1985 with the song "La det swinge" performed by Bobbysocks!, in 1995 with the song "Nocturne" performed by Secret Garden, and in 2009 with the song "Fairytale" performed by Alexander Rybak. Norway also had the two dubious distinctions of having finished last in the Eurovision final more than any other country and for having the most "nul points" (zero points) in the contest, the latter being a record the nation shared together with Austria. The country had finished last eleven times and had failed to score a point during four contests. In 2017, Norway was represented by Jowst and the song "Grab the Moment". The country ended in 10th place in the final with 158 points.

The Norwegian national broadcaster, Norsk rikskringkasting (NRK), broadcasts the event within Norway and organises the selection process for the nation's entry. The broadcaster has traditionally organised the national final Melodi Grand Prix, which has selected the Norwegian entry for the Eurovision Song Contest in all but one of their participation. On 15 May 2017, NRK revealed details regarding their selection procedure and announced the organization of Melodi Grand Prix 2018 in order to select the 2018 Norwegian entry.

Before Eurovision

Melodi Grand Prix 2018
Melodi Grand Prix 2018 was the 56th edition of the Norwegian national final Melodi Grand Prix and selected Norway's entry for the Eurovision Song Contest 2018. The show took place on 10 March 2018 at the Oslo Spektrum in Oslo, hosted by Kåre Magnus Bergh and Silya Nymoen. The show was televised on NRK1, NRK TV, broadcast via radio with commentary by Ole Christian Øen on NRK P1 as well as streamed online at NRK's official website nrk.no. The national final was watched by 1.001 million viewers in Norway, roughly 150,000 less than the viewing figures for 2017.

Competing entries 
A submission period was opened by NRK between 31 January 2017 and 10 September 2017. Songwriters of any nationality were allowed to submit entries, while performers of the selected songs would be chosen by NRK in consultation with the songwriters. In addition to the public call for submissions, NRK reserved the right to directly invite certain artists and composers to compete. At the close of the deadline, a record-breaking 1,200 submissions were received. Ten songs were selected for the competition by a 50-member focus group and the competing acts and songs were revealed on 15 January 2018 during a press conference at NRK's Store Studio, presented by Kåre Magnus Bergh and Silya Nymoen and broadcast via NRK1 and online at mgp.no. The competing entries were later premiered after the press conference.

Final
Ten songs competed during the final on 10 March 2018. The winner was selected over three rounds of voting. In the first round, the top four entries were selected by a 50/50 combination of public televoting and ten international juries to proceed to the second round, the Gold Final. The viewers and the juries each had a total of 580 points to award. Each jury group distributed their points as follows: 1–8, 10 and 12 points. The public vote was based on the percentage of votes each song achieved. For example, if a song gained 10% of the viewer vote, then that entry would be awarded 10% of 580 points rounded to the nearest integer: 58 points. In the Gold Final, the top two entries were selected solely by the public televote to proceed to the third round, the Gold Duel. In the Gold Duel, the results of the public televote were aggregated to the results from the Gold Final and led to the victory of "That's How You Write a Song" performed by Alexander Rybak with 306,393 votes.

At Eurovision 
According to Eurovision rules, all nations with the exceptions of the host country and the "Big Five" (France, Germany, Italy, Spain and the United Kingdom) are required to qualify from one of two semi-finals in order to compete for the final; the top ten countries from each semi-final progress to the final. The European Broadcasting Union (EBU) split up the competing countries into six different pots based on voting patterns from previous contests, with countries with favourable voting histories put into the same pot. On 29 January 2018, a special allocation draw was held which placed each country into one of the two semi-finals, as well as which half of the show they would perform in. Norway was placed into the second semi-final, to be held on 10 May 2018, and was scheduled to perform in the first half of the show.

Once all the competing songs for the 2018 contest had been released, the running order for the semi-finals was decided by the shows' producers rather than through another draw, so that similar songs were not placed next to each other. Norway was set to perform in position 1, preceding the entry from Romania.

Semi-final
Norway opened the second semi-final, preceding Romania. At the end of the show, they were announced as one of the ten countries who qualified for the final, meaning that Rybak had made it to the final in both of his Eurovision attempts and the second year in a row that Norway had appeared in the final. In the winners' press conference following the semi-final, Rybak participated in a draw to see which half of the final he would perform in. Ultimately, Norway were drawn to compete in the first half of the grand final. It was later revealed that Norway won the second semi-final, scoring 266 points, 133 points from the televoting and 133 points from the juries.

Final
Norway performed seventh in the grand final, following the entry from Estonia and preceding the entry from Portugal. Although expectations were high for Rybak given his track record (he spent a great deal of time as second-favourite to win in the betting odds), he ultimately didn't crack the top ten for either the juries (where he finished 16th, with a single 12 points from Italy) or the televote (where he came 11th), earning him 15th place with 144 points.

Voting
Voting during the three shows involved each country awarding two sets of points from 1-8, 10 and 12: one from their professional jury and the other from televoting. Each nation's jury consisted of five music industry professionals who are citizens of the country they represent, with their names published before the contest to ensure transparency. This jury judged each entry based on: vocal capacity; the stage performance; the song's composition and originality; and the overall impression by the act. In addition, no member of a national jury was permitted to be related in any way to any of the competing acts in such a way that they cannot vote impartially and independently. The individual rankings of each jury member as well as the nation's televoting results were released shortly after the grand final.

Points awarded to Norway

Points awarded by Norway

Detailed voting results
The following members comprised the Norwegian jury:
 Guri Schanke (jury chairperson)artist, represented Norway in the 2007 contest
 Steffen Falch (Spira)rapper, artist
 Andre BravoDJ
 artist
 artist, represented Norway in the 2000 contest as member of Charmed

References

External links
Official NRK Eurovision site
Full national final on nrk.no

2018
Countries in the Eurovision Song Contest 2018
2018
Eurovision
Eurovision